The women's canoe sprint K-1 500 metres competition at the 2016 Olympic Games in Rio de Janeiro took place between 17 and 18 August at Lagoa Stadium.

Format
The competition comprised heats, semifinals, and a final round.  The leading five in each heat plus the fastest sixth place advanced to the semifinals. The top two from each of the three semifinals plus the two best third-place times advanced to the "A" final, and competed for medals. The next eight fastest advanced to the "B" final.

Schedule
All times are Brasilia Time (UTC-03:00)

Results

Heats
The leading five in each heat plus the fastest sixth place advanced to the semifinals.

Heat 1

Heat 2

Heat 3

Heat 4

Semifinals
The top two from each of the semifinals plus the two best third-place times advanced to the "A" final. The next eight fastest advanced to the "B" final.

Semifinal 1

Semifinal 2

Semifinal 3

Finals

Final B

Final A

References

Canoeing at the 2016 Summer Olympics
Women's events at the 2016 Summer Olympics